Michael Board (born 10 October 1970 in Clapham, South London, United Kingdom) is the current British record holder In the free immersion discipline (FIM) and constant weight with fins (CWF).

British Records 

 68 M Free Immersion, 8 May 2010, British Blue Hole competition In Dahab, Egypt
 72 M Free Immersion, 3 May 2011, Freedive International Mini-comp In Dahab, Egypt
 77 M, Free Immersion, 13 September 2011, Mediterranean Cup In Kalamata, Greece
 83 M, Free Immersion, 24 September 2011, World Championships In Kalamata, Greece
 92 M, Constant Weight with Fins, 22 November 2012, Vertical Blue competition, Long Island, Bahamas
 94 M, Constant Weight with Fins, 26 November 2012, Vertical Blue competition, Long Island, Bahamas
 96 M, Constant Weight with Fins, 28 November 2012, Vertical Blue competition, Long Island, Bahamas
 91 M, Free Immersion, 11 November 2013, Vertical Blue competition, Long Island, Bahamas
 100 M, Constant Weight with Fins, 13 November 2013, Vertical Blue competition, Long Island, Bahamas
 96 M, Free Immersion, 15 November 2013, Vertical Blue competition, Long Island, Bahamas
 102 M, Constant Weight with Fins, 17 November 2013, Vertical Blue competition, Long Island, Bahamas
 103 M, Constant Weight with Fins, December 2014, Vertical Blue competition, Long Island, Bahamas
 106 M, Constant Weight with Fins, 4 May 2017, Vertical Blue 2017 Freediving competition, Deans Blue Hole, Long Island, Bahamas
 100 M, Free Immersion, 6 May 2017, Vertical Blue 2017 Freediving Competition, Deans Blue Hole, Long Island, Bahamas
 108 M, Constant Weight with Fins, 10 May 2017, Vertical Blue 2017 Freediving Competition, Deans Blue Hole, Long Island, Bahamas
 101 M, Free Immersion, 21 July 2018, Vertical Blue 2018, Deans Blue Hole, Long Island Bahamas
 111 M, Constant Weight with Fins, 25 July 2018, Vertical Blue 2018, Deans Blue Hole, Long Island, Bahamas
 102 M, Free Immersion, 26 July 2018, Vertical Blue 2018, Deans Blue Hole, Long Island, Bahamas

Personal life 

Board lives in Indonesia, on the island of Gili Trawangan, where he teaches freediving courses and training.

References

External links 

 Michael Board Profil
 7iDfXm6_8jnBXw British Freediving Record: Mike Board freedives 102 m In Constant Weight

1970 births
Living people
British freedivers